Anbudan ( With Love) is a 2000 Tamil language romantic drama film written and directed by T. Indrakumar and starring Arun Vijay and  Rambha. The film opened to mixed reviews from critics.

Plot
Sathya (Arun Vijay) is a very good artist and is known for his art. He paints pictures and sells them on the road where he meets a lot of trouble, that's where he gets to know of Thilottamal over the phone. He starts searching for her, but to no use.

In between, Nimmi (Rambha) comes as a model and falls in love with Arun, but he declines it for Thilottamal. He even thinks Meena is as mentally disturbed as Thilottamal, but she is not.

Finally, Thilottamal writes a letter to Arun that she is going to die as she is so horrible to see and that she does not deserve his love. Arun runs all the way to the cremation ground to see her at least once, but by that time they have cremated her. Arun goes to the beach and sits with tears in his eyes.

Cast
 Arun Vijay as Sathya
 Rambha as Nimmi
 Charle as Sathya's friend 
 Dhamu as Sathya's friend 
 Vaiyapuri as Sathya's friend 
 Balaji as Sathya's friend 
 Vinu Chakravarthy as Police officer
 Anandaraj as  Sathya's father
 Fathima Babu as Sathya's mother
 Madhan Bob as Press Reporter
 Meena as Shanthi (Guest appearance)

Soundtrack
Soundtrack was composed by Jai.
"Andha Suriyane" — Shankar Mahadevan, Mahalakshmi Iyer
"Oru Kadhal Devathai" — Hariharan
"Eve Tease" — Sukhwinder Singh
"Laila Laila" — Sukhwinder Singh
"Kamban Enge" — Shankar Mahadevan

References

External links
 

2000 films
2000s Tamil-language films
Indian romantic drama films
2000 romantic drama films